Events from the year 1869 in Scotland.

Incumbents

Law officers 
 Lord Advocate – James Moncreiff until October; then George Young
 Solicitor General for Scotland – George Young; then Andrew Rutherfurd-Clark

Judiciary 
 Lord President of the Court of Session and Lord Justice General – Lord Glencorse
 Lord Justice Clerk – Lord Moncreiff

Events 
 5 January – Scotland's oldest professional Association football team, Kilmarnock F.C., is founded.
 13 January – the story magazine The People's Friend is first published in Dundee; it will continue to be published by D. C. Thomson & Co. more than 140 years later.
 27 March – the Japanese ironclad Ryūjō is launched at Alexander Hall and Company's shipyard in Aberdeen.
 13 September – the Solway Junction Railway is opened for iron ore traffic, including a 1 mile 8 chain (1.8 km) viaduct across the Solway Firth.
 October – the 'Edinburgh Seven', led by Sophia Jex-Blake, start to attend lectures at the University of Edinburgh Medical School, the first women in the UK to do so (although they will not be allowed to take degrees).
 22 November – the clipper ship Cutty Sark is launched in Dumbarton, one of the last clippers built and the only one to survive in the UK.
 The Congregation of the Most Holy Redeemer first takes up residence at St Mary's Monastery, Kinnoull, Perth (built 1866-8), the first Roman Catholic monastery established in Scotland since the Reformation.
 Construction of Inverness Cathedral is finished.
 An Episcopal chapel from St Andrews is moved stone by stone in fishing boats to Buckhaven and re-erected there.
 The Caledonian Brewery is established in Shandon, Edinburgh, by George Lorimer and Robert Clark.
 Thomas McCall of Kilmarnock builds two velocipedes driven by levers to cranks on the rear wheel.
 Glasgow University Rugby Football Club is founded.

Births 
 26 January – George Douglas Brown, novelist (died 1902)
 14 February – Charles Wilson, physicist, Nobel Prize laureate (died 1959)
 17 April – Robert Robertson, chemist (died 1949)
 11 June – Walford Bodie, stage magician (died 1939)

Deaths 
 11 July – William Jerdan, journalist (born 1782)
 20 September – George Patton, Lord Glenalmond, judge (born 1803; suicide)

See also 
 Timeline of Scottish history
 1869 in the United Kingdom

References 

 
Years of the 19th century in Scotland
Scotland
1860s in Scotland